Shannons Pond Seaplane Base  is a public-use seaplane base located three nautical miles (6 km) west of the central business district of Dillingham, a city in the Dillingham Census Area of the U.S. state of  Alaska. As per Federal Aviation Administration records, this facility had 1,000 passenger boardings (enplanements) in calendar year 2008.

Facilities and aircraft 
Shannons Pond Seaplane Base has one seaplane landing area designated NE/SW which measures 1,400 by 100 feet (427 x 30 m). There are 15 single-engine aircraft based at this airport.

References

External links 
 Two float planes collide in Alaska; pilots survive (September 15, 2010)

Airports in the Dillingham Census Area, Alaska
Seaplane bases in Alaska